Mateusz Kusznierewicz (born 29 April 1975 in Warsaw) is a Polish sailor, specialising in the Finn and Star classes.

His first sailing success came in 1985, where he won the Puchar Spójni at the Zalew Zegrzyński in Warsaw. Most recently, he competed at the 2004 Summer Olympics in Athens, winning a bronze medal in the Finn.

For his sport achievements, he received the Order of Polonia Restituta: 
 Knight's Cross (5th Class) in 1996, 
 Officer's Cross (4th Class) in 2004.

Major successes
1993:
2nd place World Championships  OK Dinghy
1994:
European Champion OK Dinghy
2nd place World Championships OK Dinghy
1996:
Olympic Champion Finn Dinghy
2nd place European Championships Finn Dinghy
1998:
World Champion Finn Dinghy
Winner of the Kieler Week Finn Dinghy
1999:
Winner of the Kieler Week Finn Dinghy
2000:
World Champion Finn Dinghy
European Champion Finn Dinghy
4th place at the Olympic Games Finn Dinghy
2001:
2nd place World Championships Finn Dinghy
2002:
2nd place World Championships Finn Dinghy
Winner of the Kieler Week Finn Dinghy
2003:
2nd place European Championships Finn Dinghy
6th place World Championships Finn Dinghy
2004
European Champion Finn Dinghy
4th place World Championships Finn Dinghy
3rd place at the Olympic Games Finn Dinghy

Kusznierewicz has also won over 20 international regattas, and won ISAF Sailor of the Year in 1999.

External links
 
 
 
 

ISAF World Sailor of the Year (male)
1975 births
Living people
Sportspeople from Warsaw
Polish male sailors (sport)
World champions in sailing for Poland
Finn class world champions
Star class world champions
OK class sailors
Olympic sailors of Poland
Sailors at the 1996 Summer Olympics – Finn
Sailors at the 2000 Summer Olympics – Finn
Sailors at the 2004 Summer Olympics – Finn
Sailors at the 2008 Summer Olympics – Star
Sailors at the 2012 Summer Olympics – Star
Olympic gold medalists for Poland
Olympic bronze medalists for Poland
Olympic medalists in sailing
Medalists at the 2004 Summer Olympics
Medalists at the 1996 Summer Olympics